The Return (Återkomsten) is a 1995 novel by Håkan Nesser, translated into English in 2007 by Laurie Thompson.

1995 novels
Novels by Håkan Nesser